Neoui Gyeolhonsik (Wedding) (Your Wedding (Wedding)) was released on December 27, 2002, becoming Shinhwa's sixth studio album.  With the release of Your Wedding, Shinhwa also broke the record for being the longest running boy band in the history of Korea, a record they are still currently holding as they have not yet disbanded.  Shinhwa was also the second artist to in South Korea to release two albums (Perfect Man and Your Wedding) in a year, with Sechs Kies being first.  Your Wedding sold approximately 273,714 copies.  It was their final album with SM Entertainment. It was marketed in Japan as Wedding - Kimi to deatta toki (Japanese: ウェディング～君と出逢ったとき).

Tracks
Information is adapted from the liner notes of Your Wedding:

Chart performance

Release history

Personnel
Information is adapted from the liner notes of Your Wedding:

Album production
 Lee Soo-man – producer
 KAT – recording engineer, mixing engineer
 Yeo Doo-hyeon – recording engineer, mixing engineer
 Lee Seong-ho – recording engineer, mixing engineer
 Yoo Young-jin – recording engineer, mixing engineer
 Kim Beom-gu – recording engineer
 Kim Young-seong – recording engineer
 Kwan Seung-eun – recording engineer
 Kim Young-jin – recording engineer
 Eom Seung-hyeon – recording engineer
 Lee Jeong-hyeong – recording engineer
 Ha Jeong-soo – recording engineer
 Jeong Ki-song – recording engineer
 Jeong Hoon – mastering engineer

Guitar
 Sam Lee – "Lost in Love", "My Own Secret", "Deep Sorrow", "Later", "Missing U", "Without You", "79"
 Ham Choon-ho – "Gonna Be Alright"
 Jeong Ki-song – "Get Up"

Bass
 Lee Tae-woon – "Lost in Love", "My Own Secret", "Later", "Gonna Be Alright", "79"

Strings
 Kim Mi-jeong 9 – "Hiway (Ride With Me)"
 Min Young-ae 5 – "Get Up"

Piano
 Jo Hyeon-seok – "Deep Sorrow"
 Choi Tae-wan – "Gonna Be Alright"

Scratch
 DJ Mike - "Get Up"

References

2002 albums
Shinhwa albums
SM Entertainment albums